Franklin Township is a township in Chester County, Pennsylvania. The population was 4,352 at the 2010 census.

Geography

The mailing addresses for the township include Landenberg, Lincoln University, and Kemblesville. The township abuts Maryland on its southern border, near the Fair Hill equestrian trails and grounds.

History
The southernmost part of the township was originally disputed territory between Pennsylvania and Maryland, resolved eventually by the Mason–Dixon line. The southernmost section of the township formed the northern section of New Munster, a large settlement tract established by Maryland and named after the southern province of Munster in Ireland. New Munster acted as an early genesis point and catalyst for large Scotch-Irish settlement and expansion into Chester County and points west in Pennsylvania.  The Wooleston Grist Mill, also known as Tweed's Mill or Mackey's Mill, formed part of the New Munster tract and settlement.

Part of the township was in the London Tract, land owned by a business association known as the "London Company" from a land grant by William Penn in 1699. In 1723, the area was part of the newly established New London township, out of which Franklin Township was created in 1854. The township was so named in honor of Benjamin Franklin, who had owned land in the area.

Demographics

At the 2010 census, the township was 92.3% non-Hispanic White, 1.9% Black or African American, 0.1% Native American, 1.1% Asian, and 1.6% were two or more races. 6.4% of the population were of Hispanic or Latino ancestry.

At the 2000 census, there were 3,850 people, 1,210 households and 1,038 families living in the township. The population density was 290.7 per square mile (112.2/km2). There were 1,237 housing units at an average density of 93.4/sq mi (36.0/km2). The racial makeup of the township was 96.73% White, 1.12% African American, 0.18% Native American, 0.75% Asian, 0.49% from other races, and 0.73% from two or more races. Hispanic or Latino of any race were 1.27% of the population.

There were 1,210 households, of which 53.1% had children under the age of 18 living with them, 77.6% were married couples living together, 5.6% had a female householder with no husband present, and 14.2% were non-families. 10.1% of all households were made up of individuals, and 2.6% had someone living alone who was 65 years of age or older. The average household size was 3.18 and the average family size was 3.45.

34.3% of the population were under the age of 18, 5.4% from 18 to 24, 31.0% from 25 to 44, 24.4% from 45 to 64, and 5.0% who were 65 years of age or older. The median age was 36 years. For every 100 females, there were 99.2 males. For every 100 females age 18 and over, there were 96.8 males.

The median household income was $81,085 and the median family income was $89,718. Males had a median income of $55,208 and females $36,250. The per capita income was $28,057. About 0.6% of families and 1.7% of the population were below the poverty line, including 0.8% of those under age 18 and 2.4% of those age 65 or over.

Transportation

Pennsylvania Route 841 and Pennsylvania Route 896 are the numbered highways serving Franklin Township. PA 841 follows Chesterville Road and Wickerton Road along a southwest-northeast alignment through western, central and northern parts of the township. PA 896 follows New London Road along a northwest-southeast alignment through central portions of the township.

References

External links

 Franklin Township

Townships in Chester County, Pennsylvania
Townships in Pennsylvania